Jalsuri (Aymara) is a  mountain in the Andes in Bolivia north-east of Uyuni. It is situated in the Potosí Department, Antonio Quijarro Province, in the east of the Uyuni Municipality, at the border with the Tomave Municipality. Jasuri lies south-east of the mountain Kusuña (Cosuna, Cosuña).

References 

Mountains of Potosí Department